The following is a list of the lieutenant field marshals in Habsburg Service during the French Revolutionary Wars and the Napoleonic Wars (1792–1815).

A
 Franz, Baron Abele of Lilienberg • (1766–1861) • 58th Infantry Regiment (Austria) (1830)
 Johann Baptist, Count Alcaini  • (1748–1799) •  died of wounds, siege of Tortona
 Karl, Baron Amadey • 1723–1795 •  also Charles Baron d’Amadeï b. Brussels
 August Christian Friedrich, Duke of Anhalt-Köthen • 1769–1812, reigning prince, reigning duke  •  Quit Habsburg service in 1801.
 Nikolaus of Arberg and Valengin •  1736–1813
 Franz Count Arco • 1735–1795
 Stanislaus von Auer  • 1758–1814, Inspector of Military Clothing.  Bohemian
 Franz Xavier Johann von Auersperg  • 1749–1808 • 36th Infantry Regiment (Austria)
 Karl Joseph Franz von Auersperg •  1750–1822  • 24th Infantry Regiment (Austria), Cashiered in 1812
 Franz Xaver, Baron of Auffenberg  •  1744–1815  • 37th Infantry Regiment (Austria) 1803–1807, cashiered in 1807
 Karl Veith, Baron of Aufsess •  1734–1800
 Cornelius Hermann von Ayerenhoff •  1733–1819

B
Adam Bajalics von Bajahaza • (1723–1800) • Hungarian general
Joseph Johann of Baader • 1733–1810
Adam, Baron of Bajalics von Bajaháza • 17341800
Emerich, Baron von Bakony • 1768–1845 •33rd Infantry Regiment (Austrian)
Ludwig Karl, Count of Barbiano-Belgiojoso • 1729–1801• 41st Infantry Regiment (Austrian) 1777–177844th Infantry Regiment (Austrian) 1778–1797 • quit in 1797.
Karl von Batschek• 1715–1802• Academy of Engineers
Joseph Heinrich, Count Beckers of Westerstetten• 1764–1840• Raised to Count:  24 September 1790
Friedrich Joseph Anton, Count von Bellegarde • 1752–183044th Infantry Regiment (Austrian) 1801 – 4 January 1830
 Joseph von Bencsur 1759–1846 34th Infantry Regiment (Austrian)
Joachim, Baron Bender 1741–1818
Johann Andreas Benjowsky von Benjow und Urbanow • 1740–1822 • 31st Infantry Regiment (Austrian): 25 April 1794–25 July 1817   2nd Colonel-Proprietor of the Infantry Regiment N. 31: 25 July 1817–1 September 1822
Friedrich Wilhelm of Bentheim-Steinfurth • 1782–1839 • 9th Infantry Regiment (Austrian) 1825 – 12 October 1839
Karl Count von Bey • ? – 1819
Frederick Bianchi, Duke of Casalanza (1768–1855)

E
Karl Friedrich, Baron Am Ende • 1759–1810  • Autonomous Corp of Saxony, Netherlands

H
Friedrich Freiherr von Hotze  • (1739–1799) •  Second Battle of Zürich

K
Johann von Klenau  •  5th Chevauxleger Regiment (Austrian)

N
Friedrich Joseph, Count of Nauendorf  • 1749–1801  • 8th Hussar Regiment (Austria)

P
Giovanni Marchese di Provera •  1740–1804

 
Austrian Empire commanders of the Napoleonic Wars
Austrian lieutenant field marshals
Holy Roman Empire